Toa Payoh Group Representation Constituency (GRC) was a group representation constituency that from 1988 to 1997 comprised Kuo Chuan, Boon Teck and Toa Payoh, in the Central Region of Singapore. The MPs of Toa Payoh GRC was Ong Teng Cheong, Davinder Singh,
Ho Tat Kin and S. Dhanabalan.

Kim Keat Single Member Constituency was absorbed in the 1991 elections. In 1997, the ward was merged along with Thomson GRC to form Bishan–Toa Payoh GRC. 

Ong would resign in 1993 to contest in the Presidential Election and later become the 5th President of Singapore.

Members of Parliament

Ong Teng Cheong resigned his post in July 1993  in order to contest in the 1993 Presidential Elections. However, no by-election was called on the ground since it was a Group Representation Constituency, and the workload for the ward was distributed among the rest of the team.

Candidates and results

Elections in the 1980s

Elections in the 1990s

References 

Singaporean electoral divisions
Toa Payoh